The Central Connecticut Blue Devils women's soccer program is the college soccer team for Central Connecticut State University located in the U.S. state of Connecticut. The team competes is a member of the Northeast Conference. The team plays its home games at the 1,000 seat CCSU Soccer Field in New Britain, Connecticut. The Blue Devils are coached by Mick D'Arcy.

History 
CCSU have been to the NCAA Tournament ten times, with a record of 2–10.  They reached the second round of the tournament in 2001 and 2019.

The Blue Devils have won the Northeast Conference regular-season title 11 times, and have won the NEC Tournament title 12 times.

References 

Central Connecticut Blue Devils women's soccer